The 2021 ICC Women's T20 World Cup Americas Qualifier was a cricket tournament played in Mexico in October 2021. The matches were played as Women's Twenty20 Internationals (WT20Is), with the top team progressing to the 2022 ICC Women's T20 World Cup Qualifier tournament. Argentina and Brazil competed in an ICC women's event for the first time since 2012. The tournament's fixtures were confirmed in September 2021. The United States won the tournament, winning five of their six matches, and progressed to the Women's World Twenty20 Qualifier tournament.

There was a controversial incident in the first over of the second clash between Canada and the United States when Canadian opener Divya Saxena mishit the first delivery she faced into the air close to the pitch, then ran towards the ball causing the bowler, wicketkeeper and other fielders to fail to take what should have been a simple catch. The umpires took no action despite Saxena breaking Law 37.1 ("Obstructing the field"), and the batter went on to top score with 40 runs in a narrow seven-run win over the Americans.

Squads
The following teams and squads were named for the tournament:

Points table

 advanced to the global qualifier

Fixtures

References

External links
 Series home at ESPN Cricinfo

 
2021 in women's cricket
Associate international cricket competitions in 2021–22
ICC